Gnaphosa borea is a ground spider species with Holarctic distribution. It is found in boreal forests in Russia (Tuva, South Siberia), in the United States (Toolik Lake, Alaska, Mount Katahdin, Baxter State Park, Maine) and in Canada (Alberta, Saskatchewan, Yukon).

This species appears to be dependent on some of the conditions associated with wildfires as it is absent or rarely collected in harvest-origin stands.

See also 
 List of Gnaphosidae species

References

External links 

 
 

Gnaphosidae
Holarctic spiders
Fauna of Siberia
Tuva
Spiders of Canada
Spiders of the United States
Fauna of Alaska
Spiders described in 1908